Lennart Klockare (born 1945) is a Swedish social democratic politician, member of the Riksdag 1994–2006.

References

Members of the Riksdag from the Social Democrats
Living people
1945 births
Members of the Riksdag 2002–2006
Date of birth missing (living people)
Members of the Riksdag 1994–1998
Members of the Riksdag 1998–2002